Koos is the largest of several small islands in the Bay of Greifswald, Mecklenburg-Vorpommern, Germany. It has an area of 772 hectares and a maximum elevation of just above three meters. The island is a largely uninhabited natural reserve with restricted access. It is separated from the mainland by Kooser Bucht and Kooser See, two bays connected by a tiny strait, Beek.

In 1241, Barnuta, prince of Rügen, granted Koos (then "Chosten") to Eldena abbey (then "Hilda"), later it became a possession of the Hanseatic town of Greifswald, located a few kilometers southward. A medieval burgh has been suggested on the isle, but not verified. A 17th-century Dutch settlement had disappeared in the 18th century. Koos is administered by the nearby town of Greifswald.

References

External links

German islands in the Baltic
Pomerania
Protected areas of Mecklenburg-Western Pomerania
Nature reserves in Mecklenburg-Western Pomerania
Bay of Greifswald
Islands of Mecklenburg-Western Pomerania